Luis Miguel discography may refer to:

 Luis Miguel albums discography
 Luis Miguel singles discography

Discography